Stretham Old Engine is a steam-powered engine just south of Stretham in Cambridgeshire, England, that was used to pump water from flood-affected areas of The Fens back into the River Great Ouse. It is one of only three surviving drainage engines in East Anglia, and is a Grade II* listed building.

History
During the 17th century, large areas of fenland in East Anglia were reclaimed via extensive draining schemes. Despite this, crops and livestock were frequently swept away by widescale flooding as the land sank because of the drainage. As a partial solution, windpumps were used to pump water away from flood-affected areas, but relied on the weather and lacked the power required to lift large quantities of water. Wicken Fen nature reserve has a preserved and restored windpump, used to manage the water table in the Fen. The advent of steam power in the late 18th century offered a new solution, and these new engines began to spring up around The Fens.

Steam engine

The steam engine on the Old West River (Great Ouse) just south of Stretham was built by the Butterley Company of Derbyshire in 1831, at a cost of £4950. It replaced four nearby windmills and its scoop wheel was used successfully for over a century to lift water from flood channels back into the river. Powered by coal that was brought by barge, it consumed a ton of fuel every four hours. 

During use, the engine needed constant supervision, with the stoker and superintendent on 24-hour call. One superintendent even installed a telescope in his window so he could supervise the workmen without the need to get his feet wet.

Replacement
In 1924, the installation of a Mirrlees diesel engine saw the steam engine relegated to 'standby', and the last serious use was during the floods of 1939 and 1940. Prickwillow Museum contains a nearly identical Mirrlees diesel engine that has been preserved and restored to working order. The pumping station was later replaced with five smaller, more efficient, electrical pumps that drain into the River Cam and are still in use.

Public opening
The engine is open to the public on Sunday afternoons and Bank Holidays from the beginning of April to the end of October between 1.00pm and 5.00pm.

Picture gallery

See also
Pinchbeck Engine
Dogdyke Pumping Station

References

 The Steam Pumping Station at Stretham, Cambridgeshire by EJA Kenny and R L Hills, Transactions of the Newcomen Society, 1963-4 Vol 236.

External links

Stretham Old Engine official website

Buildings and structures in Cambridgeshire
Infrastructure completed in 1831

Grade II* listed buildings in Cambridgeshire
Tourist attractions in Cambridgeshire
Preserved beam engines
Museums in Cambridgeshire
Steam museums in England
Old Engine